Khalifa Ayil Salim Al-Noufali (born 1 March 1984), commonly known as Khalifa Ayil, is an Omani footballer who plays for Bowsher Club in the Oman Professional League.

Club career

Khalifa began his career with Oman Club. He quickly became a first team player for the club and after some fantastic showings he moved to a new club Al-Riyadh based in Riyadh, Saudi Arabia. He continued to make some impressive appearances and was quickly sought out by Qatari club Al-Sadd Sports Club which resulted in a promising deal at the club.

After his impressive appearances for Al-Sadd Sports Club, Europe soon came calling for the Omani international. At first he was wanted by Arsenal FC but Al-Sadd refused to deal with the club. He then went on a trial to Spain for Celta de Vigo where a potential loan deal could be sorted out. He fell out with the Al-Sadd management and board of directors by failing to give him his dream. It was mooted around that Celta wanted to take him first on loan with a view to playing him in the reserves and then consider a permanent transfer if the player was then eligible for a transfer to the Spanish club. However, he left Celta in August 2008 with his future very much up in the air.

In 2009, he joined top Saudi Arabian football team Al-Ittifaq. Later in the same year he came back to Qatar and signed a deal with Al-Ahli SC. In 2010, he played for Kuwaiti club Al-Kuwait SC and then after one year played for Al-Raed for almost one season. After successful stints at various clubs in the GCC he came back to his home country and signed a deal with Omani giants Dhofar. Just after one season in June 2013, Ayil signed a deal with Al-Nahda Club.

On 30 September 2014, he signed a one-year contract with Bowsher Club of the Oman Professional League.

Club career statistics

International career

Gulf Cup of Nations
Amad has made appearances in the 2003 Gulf Cup of Nations, the 2004 Gulf Cup of Nations, the 2007 Gulf Cup of Nations and the 2009 Gulf Cup of Nations.

He scored a goal in the 2004 Gulf Cup of Nations in a 3-1 win over Iraq hence helping his country to reach the semi-finals and then the finals of the Gulf Cup of Nations for the first time. But Oman lost in the final to the hosts, Qatar in a penalty shootout after the goalkeeping sensation Ali Al-Habsi missed a penalty. Qatar won the match 6-5 on penalties after the match had ended 1-1 at normal time. Amad Al-Hosni was awarded with the "Top Goal Scorer" award of the competition.

AFC Asian Cup
Khalifa has made appearances in the 2004 AFC Asian Cup qualification, the 2004 AFC Asian Cup, the 2007 AFC Asian Cup qualification and the 2011 AFC Asian Cup qualification.

He scored a goal in the 2011 AFC Asian Cup qualification in a 1-2 loss against Australia. Oman failed to qualify for the 2011 AFC Asian Cup.

FIFA World Cup qualification
Khalifa has made five appearances in the 2006 FIFA World Cup qualification and five in the 2010 FIFA World Cup qualification.

He scored a brace in the Second Round of 2006 FIFA World Cup qualification in a 7-0 win over Singapore.

National team career statistics

Goals for senior national team
Scores and results list Oman's goal tally first.

Style of play
Khalifa is naturally a centre-back, although he is a versatile player and can play as a defensive midfielder too. Due to his aggressiveness, he has had a few disciplinary problems in his career. He is known for his spectacular long range shooting skills which he has demonstrated at both the club and country level on a regular basis.

Honours

Club
With Al-Kuwait
Kuwait Crown Prince Cup (1): 2011
With Al-Nahda
Oman Professional League (1): 2013-14
Sultan Qaboos Cup (0): Runner-up 2013

References

External links
 
 
 Khalifa Ayil at Goal.com
 
 

1984 births
Living people
Omani footballers
Oman international footballers
Omani expatriate footballers
Association football defenders
2004 AFC Asian Cup players
Oman Club players
Al-Riyadh SC players
Al Sadd SC players
Ettifaq FC players
Al Ahli SC (Doha) players
Kuwait SC players
Al-Raed FC players
Dhofar Club players
Al-Nahda Club (Oman) players
Bowsher Club players
Saudi Professional League players
Qatar Stars League players
Oman Professional League players
Expatriate footballers in Saudi Arabia
Omani expatriate sportspeople in Saudi Arabia
Expatriate footballers in Qatar
Omani expatriate sportspeople in Qatar
Footballers at the 2006 Asian Games
Asian Games competitors for Oman
People from Muscat, Oman
Omani expatriate sportspeople in Kuwait
Kuwait Premier League players
Expatriate footballers in Kuwait